The Kendalls was an American country music duo composed of Royce Kendall and his daughter Jeannie Kendall. Their discography consists of 14 studio albums, four compilation albums, 46 singles, and four music videos. Of their singles, 38 charted on the U.S. Billboard Hot Country Songs charts between 1970 and 1989, including the number one singles "Heaven's Just a Sin Away" (1977), "Sweet Desire" / "Old Fashioned Love" (1978), and "Thank God for the Radio" (1984).

Albums

Studio albums

Compilation albums

Singles

1970s

1980s and 1990s

As featured artist

Music videos

Notes

References

Country music discographies
Discographies of American artists